Akshay Kumar (born 9 September 1967) is a Canadian-Indian actor, film producer and television personality who works in Hindi-language films. He won National Film Award for Best Actor in 2016 for his performances in Rustom'. He has been nominated for the Filmfare Awards several times, winning it two times. In 2008, he won the Screen Award for Best Actor (Popular Choice) for his performance in Singh Is Kinng and in 2009, he was nominated for Asian Film Award for Best Actor. In 2008, 2011, and 2013, he won the Stardust Award for Star of the Year – Male.

In 2008, the University of Windsor conferred an Honorary Doctorate of Law on Kumar in recognition of his contribution to the cinema of India. The following year he was awarded the Padma Shri by the Government of India. In 2011, The Asian Awards honoured Akshay Kumar for his achievement in Indian cinema.

Civilian award

 2009 – Padma Shri, India's fourth highest civilian award from the Government of India.

Honorary Doctorate

 2008 – Honorary Doctorate of Law by the University of Windsor in Ontario, Canada for his outstanding work in the film industry and contribution to social work.

The Asian Awards

Asian Film Awards

National Film Awards

The National Film Awards is the most prominent film award ceremony in India. Established in 1954, it is administered by the International Film Festival of India and the Indian government's Directorate of Film Festivals. The awards are presented by the President of India.

Filmfare Awards

Filmfare Awards South

Screen Awards

IIFA Awards

Stardust Awards

BIG Star Entertainment Awards

Apsara Film & Television Producers Guild Awards

Zee Cine Awards

Star Box Office Awards

The Star Box Office Awards are a collaboration between Star Plus and Box Office India. The Star Box Office Awards ceremony recognizes the achievements of Hindi films objectively, based on its performance at the box office.

Indian Television Awards

'Hello! Hall Of Fame' Awards

Star's Sabsey Favourite Awards

South Indian International Movie Awards

Other awards 
 2002 – Sansui Viewers' Choice Movie Awards: Best Actor in a Villainous role for Ajnabee
 2003 – Bollywood Fashion Awards: Celebrity Style (Male)
 2006 – Bollywood People's Choice Awards: Best Comic Performance for Garam Masala
 2006 – Best Action Actor at AXN Action Awards
 2010 – Best Action Actor in a Negative Role at AXN Action Awards for Blue
 2008 – Asia's Sexiest Man Alive
 2015 – Filmfare Glamour & Style Awards: Most Glamorous Star (Male).
 2015 – GQ Awards: Ultimate Man Of The Year Award.
 2018 – GQ India Style Awards: GQ Legend award.
 2018 – Lions Gold Award Best Actor Popular (For selfless contribution towards the nation through social message in films)
 2018 - Indian Film Festival of Melbourne Best Actor Award for Pad man. 
 2019 – HT India's Most Stylish - Hottest Trendsetter (Male).
 2004 – Rajiv Gandhi Award for his Outstanding achievements in Bollywood.
 2009 – IIFA-FICCI Frames, "Most Powerful Entertainer of the Decade Award" for his contribution to Indian cinema.

Honours and recognitions 
 2008 – Named "Sexiest Man Alive" by People (India) magazine.
 2009 – He was awarded the highest Japanese honour of "Katana" and a sixth degree Black Belt in Kuyukai Gojuryu Karate.
 2009 – He was one of the 15 international celebrities invited for the Olympics torch-bearer rally to Canada.
 2012 – He inaugurated the 43rd International Film festival of India in Goa.
 2013 – Named "Reader's Choice Style Icon".

References

External links
 List of awards and nominations received by Akshay Kumar at the Internet Movie Database

Lists of awards received by Indian actor
Lists of awards received by Canadian actor
Awards